Ob Jezeru City Stadium (literally 'Lakeside City Stadium') is a multi-use stadium in Velenje, Slovenia. It is used mostly for football matches and is the home ground of NK Rudar Velenje. The stadium is also used for athletics. Built in 1955, it was renovated in 1992 when a covered grandstand was built. In 1998, the stadium received floodlights. It has a capacity for 1,864 spectators.

See also
List of football stadiums in Slovenia

References

External links
Soccerway profile

Football venues in Slovenia
Sports venues completed in 1955
Sport in Velenje
Multi-purpose stadiums in Slovenia
1955 establishments in Slovenia